The Chinese University of Hong Kong, Shenzhen (CUHK-Shenzhen) is a campus of the public research university, the Chinese University of Hong Kong. Located in Shenzhen, on the southern coast of China near Hong Kong, it is a joint venture between the Chinese University of Hong Kong and Shenzhen University, as the local partner. CUHK-Shenzhen was officially founded on 11 October 2012, and approved by the Ministry of Education of China on 16 April 2014.

, more than 9,000 undergraduate and postgraduate students are studying at The Chinese University of Hong Kong, Shenzhen. Its long-term goal is to recruit 11,000 domestic and international students, 7,500 of whom will be undergraduate students and 3,500 Masters or PhD students.

Establishment

Background
CUHK intends to further its goals regarding education in Mainland China and conduct its further development in China with a daily-tight relationship of cooperation and combination between Hong Kong and Mainland China.

Formal establishment
In October 2009, CUHK started to expand its study opportunities in the Pearl River Delta, including considering a campus in Shenzhen.

As Chinese law prohibit foreign institutions, including those in Hong Kong, to independently establish educational institutions in the country, CUHK had to find a Chinese partner for the establishment of the new university via the regulation of "Chinese-Foreign Cooperation in Running Schools",
in which case it signed a non-binding memorandum of understanding with the Shenzhen Municipal Government where the two institutions declared their intention to enhance collaboration in education by establishing new institution in Shenzhen on 6 February 2010.

Ministry of Education of the People's Republic of China (MoE) approved plans for the new institution on 11 October 2012. On 19 March 2013, CUHK signed final agreements with Shenzhen University and the government of Shenzhen.
The MoE finally approved the establishment of Chinese University of Hong Kong, Shenzhen, on 26 March 2014.

Upon the establishment of the new institution, some Chinese University of Hong Kong alumni in Hong Kong criticized the similarity between the CUHK and CUHK-Shenzhen graduation certificates. A CUHK alumni concern group stated that the certificate should include the word Shenzhen in the title, and should mention Shenzhen University. A spokeswoman for CUHK stated that although the certificates are differentiated, "As [the] CUHK-Shenzhen degree is conferred by CUHK, the format of the certificate follows that of CUHK’s", and that the layout of the certificate was officially approved by the CUHK Senate in 2015.

Academic

Teaching
Programmes at CUHK-Shenzhen are monitored by the senate of CUHK. The senate of CUHK is responsible for the approval of new programmes at CUHK-Shenzhen before the final decisions made by the MoE.

CUHK degrees will be conferred to students of CUHK-Shenzhen who meet the requirements of corresponding degree programmes offered there. The certificate of graduation from CUHK-Shenzhen will be conferred to graduating undergraduate students by MoE.

Research
The university intends to be one of the main drivers of the High Technological Park of Longgang, which is still under government planning. As part of Shenzhen’s 13th Five-Year Plan funding research in emerging technologies they have opened three "Nobel laureate research labs" led by the Nobel laureates Arieh Warshel, Brian Kobilka and Aaron Ciechanover.

The administration of the campus has constructed several laboratories including:

 Shenzhen Research Institute of Big Data
 Shenzhen Finance Institute
 Robot Institute of CUHK-Shenzhen
 Arieh Warshel Institute of Computational Biology, the Chinese University of Hong Kong, Shenzhen
 Kobilka Institute of Innovative Drug Discovery, the Chinese University of Hong Kong, Shenzhen
 Hopcroft Institute for Advanced Study in Information Sciences, the Chinese University of Hong Kong, Shenzhen
 Ciechanover Institute of Precision and Regenerative Medicine

Resources
Many of the printed resources inside the library were sent from the Chinese University of Hong Kong.

Organisation

Collegiate system
Like CUHK, CUHK-Shenzhen has a collegiate system. There are currently four colleges in CUHK (SZ). The first college will be named Shaw College as the last donation of money from Run Run Shaw was made for the development of CUHK-Shenzhen.

Schools
So far, five schools have been built, with interdisciplinary programmes designed to address society's future needs of talents.
The five schools are:

School of Science and Engineering (SSE)
School of Management and Economics (SME)
School of Humanities and Social Science (HSS)
School of Life and Health Sciences (LHS)
School of Data Science (SDS)
School of Medicine (MED)
School of Music

Staff

University officers and council
The governing board is the highest administrative body of the university. The chairman of the board is the vice-chancellor of CUHK, currently Rocky S. Tuan. The board consists of 16 members, with eight nominated each by CUHK and Shenzhen University respectively. The president of CUHK-Shenzhen is responsible for the management of CUHK-Shenzhen under the leadership of the Governing Board. This main structure of administration is chosen due to the limitations of the laws for "Chinese-Foreign Cooperation in Running Schools". In 2013, the governing board appointed Professor Yangsheng Xu to be the first president of CUHK-Shenzhen.

Management of Services
Aviation Industry Corporation of China provides property management services for CUHK (SZ), such as logistics, services, building managements, etc.

Students

Student clubs

There are 44 student interest clubs with the official approval from the administration such as Model United Nations, English Animator and Cantonese learning club. There is also an extensive English Club organising over 30 faculties to hold weekly meetings with a small group of students for the purpose of practice and advancement of the English language.

Student Union
The Preparation Council of Student Association (PCSA) started to prepare for the establishment of the Student Union (SU) from December 2014. The SU of Shenzhen campus of CUHK was established on 9 May 2015 by a general election among students inside the campus.

The Student Union consists of three parts:

·         Student Union Standing Committees : a committee of Student Union has the authority to formulate and modify regulations, and conduct the meeting of Student Congress . (SUSC)

·         Student Union Executive Committee: a committee of Student Union has the authority to make decisions and make ensures that these decisions are carried out. (SUEC)

·         Student Union Supervision Committee: a committee of Student Union has supervisory power over some aspects of management decision-making. (SUOC)

Environment

Location
The campus is located in No 2001 Longxiang Boulevard, Longcheng Street, Longgang District, which is in the northeastern part of Shenzhen, surrounded by mountainous area with distances of around 15 kilometres northeast of downtown Shenzhen and 30 kilometres north of CUHK in Sha Tin, Hong Kong.

The site of the campus was formerly that of the cultural park of Universiade held in Shenzhen in 2011. The nearest shopping mall is "Galaxy Coco Park of Longgang" about one kilometre east of the campus, inside which there is a supermarket of Sam’s Club. The government of Shenzhen intends to develop an area of international universities based on former site of the Shenzhen Universiade Sports Centre in Longgang inside which CUHK-Shenzhen has become the first member.

Transport
There are a variety of bus routes that stop in front of the southwest gate of the campus, to various parts of Longgang and to the city centre of Shenzhen.

The nearest metro station is "Universiade Center (大运中心)", which is located about 1 kilometre northeast of the campus. It is about a 40 minute ride on the Longgang Line of the Shenzhen Metro to "Laojie Station", which is in the centre of Shenzhen. The journey to the checkpoint of "Luohu" ("Lo Wu" in Cantonese), the border crossing to Hong Kong, takes around 45 minutes by metro.

Cooperation

Research 
At present, The Chinese University of Hong Kong, Shenzhen has established four institutes led by Nobel Laureates and Turing Award winners: the Arieh Warshel Institute of Computational Biology, the Kobilka Institute of Innovative Drug Discovery, the Ciechanover Institute of Precision and Regenerative Medicine, and the Hopcroft Institute for Advanced Study in Information Sciences.

The University also established a number of research platforms, including the Robot Institute of CUHK-Shenzhen, the Shenzhen Research Institute of Big Data, the State Joint Engineering Laboratory for Robotics and Intelligent Manufacturing, the Shenzhen Engineering Laboratory of Robot and Intelligent Manufacturing, the Shenzhen Finance Institute, the Institute for Data and Decision Analytics, The Future Network of Intelligence Institute, Shenzhen Key Laboratory of Semiconductor Laser, Shenzhen Key Laboratory of Big Data and Artificial Intelligence, and Shenzhen Key Laboratory of IoT Intelligent System and Wireless Network Technology.

Exchange programmes
Currently there are summer programmes, visiting programmes, exchange programmes, and programmes of further studies signed with other universities for students. The partnerships include those with universities in North America, Europe and Asia, such as The University of British Columbia.
and Copenhagen Business School. Officers of related departments continue to make effort to create new partnerships with universities around the world.

International organisations
CUHK-Shenzhen participated in the signing ceremony for the jointly initiated "Shenzhen International Friendship City University League" (SIFCUL), which was initiated by South University of Science and Technology of China, on 9 July 2014 in order to improve internationalisation of the campus and international partnership in academic research with universities in cities belonging to friendship cities of Shenzhen.

On 30 April 2015, the fifth annual Presidents Forum of Worldwide Universities Network convened at the campus.

Future development

Admission
CUHK-Shenzhen's enrollment in mainland China follows mainland’s regulations and requirements. Currently, CUHK-Shenzhen enrolls students from 25 provinces based on students’ performance in the national college entrance exam, which is also known as Gaokao. A dual-track admission, which involves a new assessment mode named “trinity system” as well as the traditional one, is implemented in six provincial regions (Guangdong, Zhejiang, Shanghai, Shandong, Fujian and Jiangsu). In the “trinity system”, in addition to the national college entrance exam, candidates' performance in tests of high school evaluation and exams by the university are also considered. The university also enrols international students.

Construction
The campus of 1 million square meters has been completed.

Phase I campus comprises the upper, middle and lower campus. The campus design of CUHK-Shenzhen implements the spatial concept of "mountains, trees and courtyard". The campus preserves the woodland mountain ecosystem and establishes a green axis through the core of the university grounds. The buildings offer a free academic environment for staff and students and are designed to fit into nature, with such features as the semi-transparent wood barriers along Longxiang Road.The campus is still under construction with currently 100 acres of area available. The second phase will be completed at around 2022, after which the total area of the campus will be around 1,500 acres.

References

External links

 
 CUHK Extension in Shenzhen

Chinese University of Hong Kong
Educational institutions established in 2012
Universities and colleges in Shenzhen
Longgang District, Shenzhen
2012 establishments in China